Cheshmeh Khani-ye Olya (also Romanized as Cheshmeh Khānī-ye ‘Olyā) is a village in Khaveh-ye Jonubi Rural District, in the Central District of Delfan County, Lorestan Province, Iran. At the 2006 census, its population was 120, in 28 families.

References 

Towns and villages in Delfan County